Lygephila lusoria is a moth of the family Erebidae. The species was first described by Carl Linnaeus in his 1758 10th edition of Systema Naturae. It is found in southern Europe, the Near East and Middle East, European south-eastern Russia, the Caucasus, Turkey and Israel.

There are two generations per year depending on the location. Adults are on wing from May to September.

The larvae feed on Vicia and Astragalus species.

Subspecies
Lygephila lusoria lusoria
Lygephila lusoria glycyrrhizae (Rambur, 1866) (Spain)

Lygephila amasina and Lygephila subpicata were previously treated as subspecies of Lygephila lusoria.

References

External links

Fauna Europaea
Lepiforum e.V. 

Toxocampina
Moths described in 1758
Moths of Europe
Moths of Asia
Moths of the Middle East
Taxa named by Carl Linnaeus